Leslie Newman is an American screenwriter and author.

Leslie Newman may also refer to:

Leslie P. Newman (1930–2015), Australian professional ballroom dancer
Leslie John William Newman (1878–1938), Australian entomologist and horticulturist

See also
Lesléa Newman (born 1955), American author and editor